Jacques Gourde  (born January 13, 1964 in Saint-Narcisse-de-Beaurivage, Quebec) is a farmer and the Conservative Member of Parliament for Lévis—Lotbinière. He was first elected in the 2006 federal election and, on February 7, 2006 was appointed Parliamentary Secretary to the Minister of Agriculture and Agri-Food and Minister for the Canadian Wheat Board. Parliamentary Secretary to the Minister of Public Works and Government Services, for Official Languages and for the Economic Development Agency for the Regions of Quebec.

Gourde has a diploma in farming management and was a producer and exporter of hay in Saint-Narcisse-de-Beaurivage. He is married to Chantal Beaudoin and has five children.

Electoral record

References

External links

1964 births
Conservative Party of Canada MPs
Living people
Members of the House of Commons of Canada from Quebec
Canadian farmers
21st-century Canadian politicians